Bury St Edmunds is a town in Suffolk, England.

Bury St Edmunds or St Edmundsbury may also refer to:

 Borough of St Edmundsbury, a borough centred on the town of Bury St Edmunds, Suffolk, England
 The Diocese of St Edmundsbury and Ipswich, the Lord Bishop of St Edmundsbury and Ipswich and St Edmundsbury Cathedral
 Bury St Edmunds (UK Parliament constituency), a constituency in centred on the town of Bury St Edmunds
 Bury St Edmunds railway station, a station serving the town